Cheryl Elaine Brazendale (born 1963), is a female former swimmer who competed for Great Britain and England.

Swimming career
Brazendale represented Great Britain in the 1978 World Aquatics Championships.

She represented England and won a silver medal in the 4 x 100 metres freestyle, at the 1978 Commonwealth Games in Edmonton, Alberta, Canada.

Swimming for Norbeck Castle, Blackpool, she won 1976 ASA National Championship over 100 metres freestyle.

References

1963 births
Living people
English female swimmers
Commonwealth Games medallists in swimming
Commonwealth Games silver medallists for England
Swimmers at the 1978 Commonwealth Games
European Aquatics Championships medalists in swimming
Medallists at the 1978 Commonwealth Games